Walter Vidarte (18 July 1931 – 29 October 2011) was a Uruguayan actor.

Biography

He appeared in 83 films and television shows between 1958 and 2011. He starred in the film Circe, which was entered into the 14th Berlin International Film Festival.

He died in Madrid on 29 October 2011, after suffering from pancreatic cancer. His remains were incinerated at Cementerio de la Almudena.

Selected filmography
Procesado 1040 (1958)
 Alias Gardelito (1961)
 The Romance of a Gaucho (1961)
 The Venerable Ones (1962)
 Circe (1964)
 The Escaped (1964)
 Santos Vega (1971)
 The Truce (1974)
 Akelarre (1984)
 The Night of the Sunflowers (2006)

References

External links

1931 births
2011 deaths
Uruguayan expatriate actors in Argentina
Uruguayan male film actors
Uruguayan male stage actors
Male actors from Montevideo
Expatriate male actors in Argentina